Oakmont is an unincorporated community in Derry Township, Dauphin County, Pennsylvania. It is a part of the Harrisburg–Carlisle metropolitan statistical area.

References

External links 
Oakmont Profile

Harrisburg–Carlisle metropolitan statistical area
Unincorporated communities in Dauphin County, Pennsylvania
Unincorporated communities in Pennsylvania